Sisters in Arms may refer to:

 Sisters in Arms (1918 film), a British silent short film
 Sisters in Arms (2010 film), a Canadian documentary
 Sisters in Arms (2019 film), a French war drama